Plummers Landing is an unincorporated community in Fleming County, Kentucky, United States. Plummers Landing has a post office with ZIP code 41081.

References

Unincorporated communities in Fleming County, Kentucky
Unincorporated communities in Kentucky